More Best of Leonard Cohen is a collection of Leonard Cohen songs released in 1997.

Background
It is a sequel to the 1975 album The Best of Leonard Cohen and was released during a period of inactivity for the singer, who had retreated to the Mt. Baldy Zen Center near Los Angeles in 1994.  Tracks are drawn from albums I'm Your Man (1988) and The Future (1992), as well as the live album Cohen Live (1994).  The collection features two unique tracks: "Never Any Good" (recorded 1995 in Los Angeles) and "The Great Event".  During an interview with Paul Zollo that appears in the book Songwriters on Songwriting, Cohen speaks about composing "Never Any Good" and a verse not included in the final recording:
I was just working on a line this morning for a song called "I Was Never Any Good at Loving You." And the line was - I don’t think I’ve nailed it yet - "I was running from the law, I thought you knew, forgiveness was the way it felt with you" or "forgiven was the way I felt with you." Then I got a metaphysical line, about the old law and the new law, the Old Testament and the New Testament: "I was running from the law, the old and the new, forgiven was the way I felt with you." No, I thought, it’s too intellectual. Then I thought I got it: "I was running from the cops and the robbers too, forgiven was the way I felt with you." You got cops and robbers, it dignifies the line by making it available, making it commonplace.

Reception
AllMusic:  "It's easy to note important omissions - 'Came So Far for Beauty,' 'If It Be Your Will,' and 'First We Take Manhattan' are perhaps the most missed - but what's here chronicles both the continuance of Cohen's talent as a songwriter and the improvement in his deepened voice and record-making abilities in this portion of his career."

Track listing
All songs written by Leonard Cohen except as noted.

"Everybody Knows" (Cohen, Sharon Robinson)
"I'm Your Man"
"Take This Waltz" (Cohen, Federico Garcia Lorca)
"Tower of Song"
"Anthem"
"Democracy"
"The Future"
"Closing Time"
"Dance Me to the End of Love" (live)
"Suzanne" (live)
"Hallelujah" (live)
"Never Any Good"
"The Great Event"

Charts

Weekly charts

Year-end charts

Certifications

References 

1997 greatest hits albums
Leonard Cohen compilation albums
Columbia Records compilation albums